William Perry Brown Jr. (December 18, 1923 – February 24, 1952) was a highly decorated United States Marine Corps aviator. He was a flying ace and a recipient of two Navy Crosses and was killed in the Korean War.

World War II 
William P. Brown was born in Lovelady, Texas, on December 18, 1923. On September 5, 1942, he enlisted in the United States Navy under the Aviation Cadet Program. He was commissioned in the Marines as a Second Lieutenant on November 16, 1943, and sent to Naval Air Station Jacksonville, Florida, where he attended F4U Corsair Combat Marine Fighter Operation Training. Afterwards, he was assigned to Marine Fighting Squadron 462 (VMF-462) at Marine Corps Air Station El Centro, California.

Brown was sent overseas where he was ultimately assigned to Marine Fighting Squadron 311 (VMF-311) during the battle of Okinawa in April 1945. On April 28, he shot down two Japanese planes. Just six days later on May 4, Brown personally shot down four Japanese planes in four minutes and earned the title of ace as well as his first Navy Cross. He scored a total of seven aerial victories during the battle and was the leading ace of his squadron. Brown then was briefly stationed at Peleliu and was there when the war ended. He was also awarded two Distinguished Flying Crosses during the war.

Post-World War II 
Brown was then assigned as a flight instructor at Naval Air Station Pensacola, Florida in December 1945. He married in 1947 and had two daughters with his wife. In September 1947, he was stationed at Marine Corps Air Station El Toro, California and remained there until January 1950. He attended numerous courses afterwards before deploying to Korea. His son was born three months after his death.

Korean War and death 
On February 6, 1952, Captain Brown left the United States and arrived in Korea on February 15, where he was assigned to the 1st Marine Aircraft Wing. Just nine days later, on February 24, Brown was temporarily attached to Marine Fighting Squadron 323 (VMF-323) and took part in an eight plane strike against enemy railroads and bridges in Sariwon, North Korea. He successfully dropped a 1,000 pound bomb on a rail line when he spotted an enemy truck convoy entering a heavily defended supply facility. He unhesitatingly pressed a strafing attack on the convoy while taking continuous anti-aircraft fire. Despite his plane taking catastrophic hits and bursting into flames, he continued his dive, firing his guns until his plane crashed and exploded in the middle of the convoy.

William P. Brown's body was never recovered. For his actions during his last combat mission, Brown was posthumously awarded his second Navy Cross. Several cenotaphs have been erected in his honor, including one in his hometown.

Awards and decorations

1st Navy Cross citation
Citation:

The President of the United States of America takes pleasure in presenting the Navy Cross to Second Lieutenant William Perry Brown, Jr., United States Marine Corps Reserve, for extraordinary heroism and distinguished service in the line of his profession as Pilot of a Fighter Plane in Marine Fighting Squadron THREE HUNDRED ELEVEN (VMF-311), Marine Air Group THIRTY-ONE (MAG-31), FOURTH Marine Aircraft Wing, in aerial combat against enemy Japanese forces off Okinawa, Ryukyu Islands, on 4 May 1945. Leading his division on a combat air patrol, Second Lieutenant Brown sighted a flight of eleven enemy planes. Immediately giving battle, he fought his plane gallantly to shoot down four of the hostile craft and, by his expert flight leadership, contributed materially to the success of his division in destroying the remaining eight Japanese planes. His superb airmanship, courage and devotion to duty were in keeping with the highest traditions of the United States Naval Service.

2nd Navy Cross citation
Citation:

The President of the United States of America takes pride in presenting a Gold Star in lieu of a Second Award of the Navy Cross (Posthumously) to Captain William Perry Brown, Jr., United States Marine Corps Reserve, for extraordinary heroism in connection with military operations against an armed enemy of the United Nations while serving as Pilot of a Plane temporarily attached to Marine Fighting Squadron THREE HUNDRED TWENTY-THREE (VMF-323), in action against enemy aggressor forces in the Republic of Korea on 24 February 1952. Volunteering to participate in an eight-plane strike against heavily defended rail and bridge installations along a main enemy supply route at Sariwon, Captain Brown fearlessly pressed home his attack in the face of an intense barrage of hostile anti-aircraft fire and scored a direct hit on a rail line with a 1,000-pound bomb. Spotting a convoy of enemy trucks entering a well-fortified supply center while he was recovering from his initial dive, he immediately launched a low-level strafing run on the objective despite damage to his plane from continuous hostile ground fire. Although his aircraft burst into flames, Captain Brown bravely continued to dive on the vehicles with his guns blazing until his plane crashed and exploded amid the convoy. His outstanding courage, superb airmanship and valiant devotion to duty in the face of overwhelming odds reflect the highest credit upon Captain Brown and the United States Naval Service. He gallantly gave his life for his country.

See also 
 Charles J. Loring Jr., Air Force pilot who also crashed plane into enemy target
 Kenneth L. Reusser, Marine pilot also awarded one Navy Cross at Okinawa and one in Korea
 List of World War II aces from the United States
 List of Navy Cross recipients for World War II
 List of Navy Cross recipients for the Korean War
 Louis J. Sebille, Air Force pilot who also crashed plane into enemy target

References 

1923 births
1940s missing person cases
1952 deaths
American Korean War pilots
Aviators killed by being shot down
American military personnel killed in the Korean War
American World War II flying aces
Aviators from Texas
Military personnel from Texas
People from Houston County, Texas
Recipients of the Navy Cross (United States)
Recipients of the Distinguished Flying Cross (United States)
United States Marine Corps officers
United States Marine Corps personnel of the Korean War
United States Marine Corps pilots of World War II
United States Navy pilots of World War II